CHA Hollywood Presbyterian Medical Center, formerly known as Queen of Angels-Hollywood Presbyterian Medical Center, is a private hospital located at 1300 North Vermont Avenue in Los Angeles, California. The hospital has 434 beds. It is owned by South Korea-based CHA Medical Group.

History
Hollywood Presbyterian Medical Center in Los Angeles, California, was an acute-care facility that has been caring for the Hollywood community and surrounding areas since 1924. The hospital is committed to serve local, multicultural communities with qualified medical and nursing care.
 
In 2004, HPMC joined the CHA medical Group which has CHA Biotech corporation, Cha university, medical center in Gangnam, Bundang, Gumi and renamed it CHA Hollywood Presbyterian Medical Center. CHA Hollywood Presbyterian Medical Center is the first Korean-owned and operated general hospital in the United States. 
The hospital is an acute-care 7-building facility with 434 licensed beds, 1,400 employees and an 800-member medical staff. With more than 500 physicians representing nearly every specialty, CHA Hollywood Presbyterian Medical Center distinguishes itself as a leading healthcare facility recognized for providing qualified, innovative care in a compassionate manner.

In 1989, the operations of the Queen of Angels Hospital were merged with the Hollywood Presbyterian Medical Center. The name of the hospital then became the Queen of Angels - Hollywood Presbyterian Medical Center. The Queen of Angels building, a Spanish-style hospital complex was used mainly as a movie set.

Accreditation 
CHA Hollywood Medical Center is an accredited Primary Stroke Center certified by the Joint Commission and is baby-friendly, where all mothers and newborn infants remain together after delivery to create strong bonds.

Improvement in ED services 
Recently there has been a major improvement in ED services for patients. It is divided into three tracks according to the severity of the symptoms to provide fast emergency services. This allows patients to receive shorter waiting times and immediate treatment.

Awards 
CHA Hollywood Presbyterian Medical Center has been recognized by Healthgrades for 1 Hospital Quality Award (Patient Safety) and 2 Clinical Quality Awards (Labor and Delivery, Obstetrics and Gynecology) in 2017.
CHA Hollywood Presbyterian Medical Center has earned the Get With The Guidelines® - Stroke GOLD PLUS Quality Achievement Award and is also qualified for recognition on the Target: Stroke Honor Roll Elite Plus.

Ten-Year Expansion and Modernization Master Plan 

The master plan was designed to expand and modernize its facility and to fulfill the state's seismic safety mandate that all hospitals must meet by 2020.
 
There would be new emergency department. The emergency department is staffed by a trained, multilingual team of physicians, nurses and ancillary staff, providing a culturally sensitive resource for the community.

Also included in Phase 1 of the master plan is building a new 650-spot parking structure for patients, employees and visitors and beautifying overall internal and external designs of the hospital campus. The anticipated completion date was fall 2019.

Controversies

"Patient dumping" 
In February 2007, an investigation was launched after a hospital official allegedly "dumped" 54-year-old Gabino Olvera, a paraplegic patient, on a Skid Row street. According to witnesses, Olvera was removed from a hospital van and was left writhing in a gutter, wearing nothing more than a soiled gown and a broken colostomy bag. The hospital agreed to pay  and be monitored for up to 5 years as part of a settlement agreement reached in 2008.

Ransomware 
In 2016, the hospitals computer system was hijacked by ransomware forcing the hospital to use paper. Patients were asked to pick up lab results in person.

In popular culture
Exterior scenes of the hospital was used for the 1979-86 CBS medical drama series, Trapper John, M.D.

References

External links

This hospital in the CA Healthcare Atlas A project by OSHPD

Hospital buildings completed in 1924
Hospitals in Los Angeles
Buildings and structures in Hollywood, Los Angeles
East Hollywood, Los Angeles
Teaching hospitals in California